Song Byung-gu (born 4 August 1988) is a South Korean professional StarCraft Protoss player from Pohang who plays under the alias Stork[gm] or simply Stork.

Tournament results

Individual
 3rd 2007 Daum Starleague: 3rd
 GomTV MSL: 2nd 
 1st World Cyber Games 2007 Grand Final
 2nd 2008 EVER OnGameNet Starleague
 2nd 2008 Bacchus OnGameNet Starleague 2nd
 1st WWI 2008
 1st 2008 Incruit Starleague
 2nd World Cyber Games 2008 Grand Final
 2nd World Cyber Games 2009 Grand Final
 1st IEF 2009
 2nd 2010 Bacchus OnGameNet Starleague

Samsung KHAN
 Shinhan bank Proleague 2007: 1st
 Shinhan bank Proleague 2007: MVP
 Shinhan bank Proleague 2007 Final: MVP

KESPA awards
 2005: Rookie of the Year
 2007: Best Player – Protoss

OSL/MSL/WCG career statistics

2008-2009 season

2008–2009 season

2004–2008 season

See also
 StarCraft professional competition
 Samsung Khan
 Starleague
 MSL
 Electronic sports

References

Living people
South Korean esports players
StarCraft players
1988 births
People from Pohang
Samsung Galaxy (esports) players
South Korean Buddhists